Sasanarakkha Buddhist Sanctuary (SBS) is a Buddhist monastery in Taiping, Perak, Malaysia. It was founded in January 2000 by Ven. Aggacitta as a training centre for Malaysian Theravada Buddhist monks.  Its mission is to prepare novices to live in accordance with the DhammaVinaya — the core principles of Buddhism — as enshrined in the Pali Canon.

See also
Theravada
List of Buddhist temples

References

External links

 http://www.sasanarakkha.org/

Theravada Buddhist temples
Buddhist temples in Malaysia
Religious buildings and structures in Perak